Northern Exposure is an American Northern comedy-drama television series about the eccentric residents of a fictional small town in Alaska that ran on CBS from July 12, 1990, to July 26, 1995, with a total of 110 episodes. It received 57 award nominations during its five-year run and won 27, including the 1992 Primetime Emmy Award for Outstanding Drama Series, two additional Primetime Emmy Awards, four Creative Arts Emmy Awards, and two Golden Globes. Critic John Leonard called Northern Exposure "the best of the best television in the past 10 years".

In the show, Rob Morrow played New York City native Joel Fleischman, a recently graduated physician who is sent to practice in Anchorage, Alaska, for several years to repay the state of Alaska for underwriting his medical education. However, much to his chagrin, he is assigned to the much smaller and remote town of Cicely, which is in need of a general practitioner. Originally the show focused on Fleischman's fish-out-of-water experiences in rural Alaska, but as it progressed, it became more of an ensemble show, focusing on various other Cicely residents.

History
The series was created by Joshua Brand and John Falsey, who also created the award-winning shows St. Elsewhere and I'll Fly Away. It started as a mid-season replacement summer series on CBS in 1990 with 8 episodes. It returned for seven more episodes in spring 1991, then became a regular part of the network's schedule in 1991–92. It ranked among the top 10 viewed by 18- to 49-year-olds, and was part of the network's 1992–93 and 1993–94 schedules. Its last season, 1994–95, included a gap during the May 1995 sweeps when CBS broadcast other programming. "The show had a lot of life in it, and the move (Wednesday at 10pm) killed it," said executive producer Andrew Schneider. "This piddling out is sad."

In 1994, writer Sandy Veith won a suit in a jury trial against Universal, alleging that the series was based on his idea, yet he received no credit or compensation. Veith won $10 million in damages and legal fees on appeal in 1997. His suit was against the studio, not Brand and Falsey. In 1994, the Los Angeles Times reported that jurors seemed to believe the studio came to Brand and Falsey with the basic concept for the show rather than that the latter knowingly stole his idea. Some Universal executives had worked with Veith and Brand and Falsey. Veith's script was about an Italian-American doctor who moves to a small town in the South.

Morrow and his representatives spent much of seasons 4 and 5 lobbying for an improved contract, and intermittently threatened to leave the show. The producers responded by reducing Fleischman's role in the storylines, and introducing characters such as Mike Monroe (season 4) and Dr. Phil Capra (season 6) to partially compensate for the absence of Morrow, whose last appearance came midway through the show's final season.

Cast and characters

Joel Fleischman (Rob Morrow) is a neurotic young Jewish physician from New York City. Fresh out of family medicine residency, he is legally contracted to practice medicine for four years in Alaska according to the terms of a student loan underwritten by the state. Expecting to work in a relatively large, modern hospital in Anchorage, he is unexpectedly reassigned to be a general practitioner in the small town of Cicely, where he is a proverbial fish out of water. His struggles to adjust to the very unfamiliar environment drive the plot of many episodes, especially in the early seasons. Morrow left the show midway through its final season due to a contract dispute. His character's departure was handled by having him "go native", abandoning Cicely for a remote fishing village and embracing the wilderness in a search for spiritual enlightenment.
Maurice Minnifield (Barry Corbin) is a multi-millionaire businessman, former fighter pilot and astronaut who moved to the area after retiring from the military in the 1970s. It is Maurice who arranged to bring Joel to the town, which previously did not have a physician. Beneath a thin veneer of gentility, he is pompous, overbearing, and bigoted, leading to conflicts with other residents, such as the gay couple Ron and Eric. Despite his habitual demeanor, Maurice can be generous, and he aids almost every other major character in some way during the show's run. Before the timeline of the series, he had brought the much younger Shelly Tambo to Cicely with the intention of marrying her, but his best friend Holling Vincoeur won her heart and hand in marriage.
Maggie O'Connell (Janine Turner) is a tomboyish Grosse Pointe, Michigan-born debutante turned Alaska bush pilot. Maggie and Joel quickly develop a love-hate relationship, with their opposing views on most subjects coupled with unacknowledged attraction resulting in sexual tension in the early seasons. They become romantically involved later in the show's run, and it is their breakup that is the impetus for Joel to leave Cicely during the last season. A running theme through the series is that all of Maggie's previous romantic partners die bizarre deaths, leading others to wonder if she suffers from an "O'Connell curse". 
Holling Vincoeur (John Cullum) is the Canadian-born sexagenarian owner and operator of The Brick, a popular local bar and restaurant, and mayor at the beginning of the show. He and Maurice are old friends, though their relationship was strained at one time by their mutual romantic interest in Shelly Tambo, whom Holling married. Though at least 40 years older than Shelly, he fears that he will outlive her, since the men in his family tend to live well past 100 and spend their final years as heartbroken widowers.
Shelly Tambo (Cynthia Geary) is another Canadian expatriate and former Miss Northwest Passage, originally from Saskatoon. She was brought to Cicely by Maurice, who had hoped to marry her. Instead, she chose Holling and became a waitress at The Brick. Though seemingly naive and flighty, she regularly shows flashes of unexpected wisdom. It was planned for the character to be a Native American until Geary was cast.
Chris Stevens (John Corbett) is a philosophical free spirit and ex-convict who works as the disc jockey at KBHR 570 AM. Between songs, Chris offers comments on events in Cicely and on more intellectual and controversial subjects, often leading to conflict with Maurice, who fires and rehires him several times. The first of these conflicts comes when Chris reads Walt Whitman's Leaves of Grass over the air and Maurice storms the studio, decks Chris and fires him, not over the reading, but for suggesting that Whitman was homosexual. Chris is also a nondenominational clergyman and occasionally officiates at weddings.
Ed Chigliak (Darren E. Burrows) is a mild-mannered, half-native Alaskan foundling  raised by local Tlingits. Ed does odd jobs for Maurice and works part-time at the local general store. He is a film buff and would-be movie director.
Ruth-Anne Miller (Peg Phillips) is the elderly, level-headed owner of the local general store and a 30-year resident of Cicely. A widow, Ruth-Anne lives alone until late in the series, when she becomes involved with Walt Kupfer (Moultrie Patten), a fur trapper and retired stockbroker. She too is a film buff and, along with Holling, a keen birder. She has two adult sons, one of whom is a stockbroker. He comes to see her in one episode.
Marilyn Whirlwind (Elaine Miles) is Joel's Alaska Native receptionist. Her few words and exceptionally calm demeanor are a strong contrast to her employer's loquaciousness and high-strung temperament.

In the show's last season, two new characters were introduced to try to fill the void left by Morrow's departure:
Phil Capra (Paul Provenza), a doctor from Los Angeles who is recruited as Joel's replacement after Joel takes to the wilderness.
Michelle Schowdowski Capra (Teri Polo), Phil's wife. She also works as a reporter for a newspaper owned by Maurice.

Major recurring characters include Apesanahkwat as Lester Haines (a native millionaire), Anthony Edwards as Mike Monroe (an environmental activist with multiple chemical sensitivity), Richard Cummings Jr. as Bernard Stevens (Chris's African American half-brother and "spiritual doppelgänger"), Graham Greene as Leonard (the local shaman), Diane Delano as Officer Barbara Semanski (Maurice's love interest), Adam Arkin as mysterious, obnoxious master chef Adam, and Valerie Mahaffey as his hypochondriac and very wealthy wife Eve. Mahaffey was the only actor from the series to win an Emmy Award.

Production
Although Cicely is widely thought to be based on Talkeetna, Alaska, its main street and the filming location was that of Roslyn, Washington. "Northern Exposure II" (the main production facility) was in Redmond, Washington, in what is now the headquarters of Genie Industries, behind a business park.

According to The Northern Exposure Book, the moose in the opening titles was named Mort and was provided by Washington State University, where he was part of a captive herd. To film the opening sequence, the crew fenced off Roslyn, set Mort loose, and lured him around with food.

Episodes

Notable episodes in the series include the pilot (nominated for an Emmy for Outstanding Writing), the third season's last episode, "Cicely" (which won a Peabody Award, three Creative Arts Emmy Awards, and a Directors Guild of America Award), and the fifth-season episode "I Feel the Earth Move", which featured the second same-sex marriage story arc on U.S. prime-time television. (Fox's Roc aired the first U.S. prime-time television episode depicting a same-sex marriage, "Can't Help Loving That Man", on October 20, 1991.)

Reception
On Rotten Tomatoes, the first season of Northern Exposure has a score of 100% based on six reviews, with an average rating of 7.0/10. On Metacritic, which uses a weighted score, the first season is rated 80 based on seven reviews, indicating "generally favorable reviews," while the second season has an 83 based on nine, indicating "universal acclaim".

Entertainment Weekly’s Ken Tucker gave the first episode a B+, writing that the show “may well prove to be summer television’s most likably eccentric series”.

Ratings
Season 1 (Thursday 10 pm): 12.4 rating (highest-rated episode: "A Kodiak Moment", 10.1 rating) (competed against NBC's Must See TV) 
Season 2 (Monday 10 pm): 15.5 rating (highest-rated episode: "Goodbye to All That", 13.9 rating)
Season 3: 16.3 rating (highest-rated episode: "Wake Up Call", 19.6 rating/26 million viewers)
Season 4: 15.8 rating (highest-rated episode: "Northwest Passages", 18.3 rating)
Season 5: 14.5 rating (highest-rated episode: "A Bolt from the Blue", 16.2 rating)
Season 6 (Monday at 10 pm; Wednesday at 9 pm): 11.2 rating (highest-rated episode: "Eye of the Beholder", 13.7 rating)

Accolades

Emmy Awards
Over the course of Northern Exposure's run, the cast and crew won seven Emmy Awards out of 39 nominations:
 Joshua Brand, John Falsey, et al., for Outstanding Drama Series (1992)
 Valerie Mahaffey, for Outstanding Supporting Actress in a Drama Series (1992)
 Andrew Schneider and Diane Frolov, for Outstanding Individual Achievement in Writing for a Drama Series for the episode "Seoul Mates" (1992)
 Thomas R. Moore, for Outstanding Individual Achievement in Editing for a Series for the episode "Cicely" (1992)
 Woody Crocker, Kenneth Berg and Gene Serdena, for Outstanding Individual Achievement in Art Direction for a Series for "Cicely" (1992)
 Frank Prinzi, for Outstanding Cinematography for a Series for "Cicely" (1992)
 William H. Angarola et al., for Outstanding Individual Achievement in Sound Editing for a Series for "Fish Story" (1994)

Golden Globe Awards
The series won two Golden Globe awards for Best Drama series, in 1992 and 1993. In addition, Morrow and Turner were each nominated three times consecutively from 1992 to 1994 for Best Actor and Actress, while Corbett was nominated in 1993 for his supporting role.

Peabody Awards
The series won a pair of consecutive Peabody Awards: in 1991–92 for the show's "depict[ion] in a comedic and often poetic way, [of] the cultural clash between a transplanted New York City doctor and the townspeople of fictional Cicely, Alaska" and its stories of "people of different backgrounds and experiences" clashing but who ultimately "strive to accept their differences and co-exist".

Additional awards and nominations
1995
 American Cinema Editors – Eddie nomination for Best Edited One-Hour Series for Television – Briana London – for episode "Lovers and Madmen"
 Environmental Media Awards, USA – Award for Ongoing Commitment – Josh Brand and John Falsey
 Screen Actors Guild Awards – Nomination for Outstanding Performance by an Ensemble in a Comedy Series

1994
 BMI TV Music Award: Northern Exposure – David Schwartz
 Casting Society of America, USA – Artios nomination for Best Casting for TV, Dramatic Episodic – Megan Branman

1993
 American Cinema Editors – Eddie nomination for Best Edited One-Hour Series for Television – Thomas R. Moore– for episode "Cicely"
 American Society of Cinematographers, USA – ASC Award nomination for Outstanding Achievement in Cinematography in Regular Series – Frank Prinzi
 BMI TV Music Award: Northern Exposure – David Schwartz
 Casting Society of America, USA – Artios nomination for Best Casting for TV, Dramatic Episodic – Megan Branman
 Directors Guild of America Award – Outstanding Directorial Achievement in Dramatic Shows – Night – for episode "Cicely"
 Robert Loeser (second assistant director) (plaque)
 Patrick McKee (first assistant director) (plaque)
 Jack Terry (II) (unit production manager) (plaque)
 Robert C. Thompson
 Directors Guild Award – Outstanding Directorial Achievement in Dramatic Shows – Night – For episode "Kaddish for Uncle Manny"
 Michael Lange
 Electronic Media Critics Poll – Best Television Series
 Environmental Media Awards, USA – EMA Award TV Drama – for episode "Survival of the Species"
 Retirement Research Foundation, USA – Wise Owl Award – Honorable Mention Television and Theatrical Film Fiction – Joshua Brand (executive) John Falsey (executive) – for episode "Three Amigos"

1992
 BMI TV Music Award: Northern Exposure – David Schwartz
 Casting Society of America, USA – Artios for Best Casting for TV, Dramatic Episodic – Megan Branman and Patricia Carnes Kalles
 Electronic Media Critics Poll – Best Television Series
 Grammy Award Nomination: Northern Exposure Theme – David Schwartz
 Peabody Award – Presented to Falsey-Austin Street Productions for Northern Exposure, for presenting episodic drama on television with intelligence, sensitivity and humor.
 PGA Golden Laurel Awards – Television Producer of the Year Award – Joshua Brand and John Falsey
 Retirement Research Foundation, USA – Wise Owl Award – Honorable Mention Television and Theatrical Film Fiction – Joshua Brand (executive), John Falsey (executive) – for episode "A Hunting We Will Go"
 Television Critics Association – Program of the Year
 Viewers for Quality Television – John Cullum, Best Supporting Actor in a Drama Series
 Viewers for Quality Television – Adam Arkin, Best Specialty Player
 Young Artist Awards – nomination for Best Young Actor Guest-Starring or Recurring Role in a TV Series – Grant Gelt, for episode "Goodbye to All That"

1991
 Casting Society of America, USA – Artios win for Best Casting for TV, Dramatic Pilot – Megan Branman, Patricia Carnes Kalles and Lynn Kressel
 Casting Society of America, USA – Artios nomination for Best Casting for TV, Dramatic Episodic – Megan Branman and Patricia Carnes Kalles
 Electronic Media Critics Poll – Best Television Series

Soundtracks

Northern Exposure: Music from the Television Series (USA, original soundtrack, 1992)MCA Records, Inc. MCAD-10685

 "Theme from Northern Exposure" – David Schwartz (Pilot, Kodiak)
 "Jolie Louise" – Daniel Lanois (Pilot, The Body in Question, Old Tree)
 "Hip Hug-Her" – Booker T. and the MG's (Animals R Us; My Mother, My Sister)
 "At Last" – Etta James [Slow Dance]
 "Everybody Be Yoself" – Chic Street Man (Spring Break)
 "Alaskan Nights" – David Schwartz (It Happened in Juneau, Our Tribe)
 "Don Quichotte" – Magazine 60 (Jules et Joel)
 "When I Grow Too Old to Dream" – Nat 'King' Cole and His Trio (The Big Kiss)
 "Emabhaceni" – Miriam Makeba (Roots)
 "Gimme Three Steps" – Lynyrd Skynyrd (My Mother, My Sister)
 "Baïlèro" from Chants d'Auvergne – Frederica von Stade, Royal Philharmonic Orchestra, Antonio de Almeida, conductor (Wake-Up Call)
 David Schwartz Medley:
"A Funeral in My Brain" (Things Become Extinct, Our Tribe, Ill Wind,...)
"Woody the Indian" (Sex, Lies, and Ed's Tape)
"The Tellakutans" (Seoul Mates, The Body in Question)

More Music from Northern Exposure (USA, 1994)MCA Records, Inc. MCAD-11077

 Ojibway Square Dance (Love Song) – Georgia Wettlin-Larsen 
 Theme from Northern Exposure – David Schwartz 
 Stir It Up – Johnny Nash 
 Mambo Baby – Ruth Brown 
 Someone Loves You – Simon Bonney
 The Ladder – David Schwartz
 If You Take Me Back – Big Joe & His Washboard Band 
 Un  Casse (A Broken Marriage) – Basin Brothers
 There I Go Again – Vinx
 Lay My Love – Brian Eno/John Cale
 Wrap Your Troubles in Dreams (and Dream Your Troubles Away) – Les Paul & Mary Ford 
 Mooseburger Stomp – David Schwartz
 I May Want a Man – Joanne Shenandoah
 Our Town—played during the closing scene of the last episode (July 26, 1995) – Iris Dement

Ausgerechnet Alaska (German covers, 1992),Distributed by IDEAL Vertrieb, Wichmannstr. 4, 2000 Hamburg 52 (Out of Print)

 The Moose – Northern Exposure Theme-Mix
 The Kingsmen – Louie Louie
 Little Milton – Stand by Me
 Lee Dorsey – Ya Ya
 Billy Stewart – Summertime
 Little Richard – Good Golly Miss Molly
 Coasters – Little Egypt
 The Drifters – On Broadway
 Dolly Parton – It Wasn't God Who Made Honky Tonk Angels
 Guy Mitchell – Singing The Blues
 Patsy Cline – Crazy
 Paul Anka – My Way
 The Marcels – Blue Moon
 Showaddywaddy – Who Put The Bomp
 Trini Lopez – This Is Your Land
 Jerry Butler – Moon River
 Andy Williams – Love Is a Many-Splendored Thing

Home media

DVD releases
Universal Studios Home Entertainment has released all six seasons on DVD in Regions 1, 2 and 4. The Region 1 DVD releases have caused controversy among the show's fans due to their high prices and the changes to the soundtrack introduced in order to lower their costs. The release of Season 1 contained the original music, but retailed for $60 due to the cost of music licensing. Subsequent seasons replaced most of the music with generic elevator-style music, resulting in a lower-cost release. The first and second seasons were also rereleased together in packaging that matches the third through sixth seasons. On July 21, 2020, "Northern Exposure" was rereleased by Shout Factory, containing all 110 episodes but not with all original music. The R2 editions released in Germany on DVD contain all the original music.

Blu-ray releases
On March 19, 2018, Fabulous Films released the entire series on Blu-ray in the UK containing all original music.

Potential revival
In 2016, Darren Burrows and his production company, Film Farms, held a crowdfunding campaign to fund a development project with the goal of creating more episodes. The working title for this project is "Northern Exposure: Home Again". Despite not meeting the original $100,000 goal, Darren decided to continue with the project.

On June 17, 2016, Film Farms announced that writer David Assael had been hired to write for the project. He previously wrote several episodes, including "Russian Flu," "Spring Break," and "It Happened in Juneau," among others. The revival was originally envisioned as a two-hour "visit to Cicely," but a ten-episode series was reportedly being pitched to various network, cable, and streaming venues.

On November 20, 2018, it was reported that a revival series was in the early stages of development at CBS, with Brand, Falsey, and Morrow executive producing and Morrow again playing Fleischman. Corbett was named as producer but his appearance as a performer was not confirmed.

Falsey died in January 2019, and on May 19, 2019, Josef Adalian, an editor from the New York City-based magazine Vulture,  that CBS had cancelled development work on the series. Adalian subsequently tweeted that the rights holder, Universal Studios, could pitch the revival elsewhere, but it was unclear whether Universal was planning to move the project to another outlet. Morrow, who was busy with other commitments, found out about Falsey's death on Twitter.

On November 15, 2019, Morrow revealed in an interview on radio station WGN 720AM in Chicago that he and Brand were continuing revival efforts despite Falsey's death and CBS's decision.

References and footnotes

External links

 Northern Exposure DVDs at Universal Studios

1990s American comedy-drama television series
1990s American medical television series
1990 American television series debuts
1995 American television series endings
Best Drama Series Golden Globe winners
CBS original programming
English-language television shows
Peabody Award-winning television programs
Primetime Emmy Award for Outstanding Drama Series winners
Primetime Emmy Award-winning television series
Television series about Jews and Judaism
Television series by Universal Television
Television series created by John Falsey
Television series created by Joshua Brand
Television shows filmed in Washington (state)
Television shows set in Alaska